In computer programming, a subroutine (a.k.a. function) will often inform calling code about the result of its computation, by returning a value to that calling code.
The data type of that value is called the function's return type.

In the C++ programming language, a function must be declared.
The C++ function's return type is specified as a part of declaring that function.
A trailing return type is like a traditional return type, except that it is specified in a different location.

Syntax
An ordinary return type is specified before the function's name.
In this example of traditional C++ code, the return type of HasMultipleItems() is bool:
class CClass {
public:
    bool HasMultipleItems();
    std::vector<int> m_veciMember;
};

bool CClass::HasMultipleItems() {
    return m_veciMember.size() > 1;
}
A trailing return type is specified after the parameter list, following -> symbols:
class CClass {
public:
    auto HasMultipleItems() -> bool;
    std::vector<int> m_veciMember;
};

auto CClass::HasMultipleItems() -> bool {
    return m_veciMember.size() > 1;
}

Distinction from other language features
In modern C++, the meaning of the auto keyword will depend on its context:
 When used in a variable's definition (e.g., auto x = 11;), the auto keyword indicates type inference. The data type for that x will be deduced from its initialization.
 On the other hand, there is no type inference in the HasMultipleItems() example. That example only uses the auto keyword as a syntactic element, because a trailing return type is being used.

Rationale
Consider the task of programming a generic version of int Add(const int& lhs, const int& rhs) { return lhs + rhs; }.
A proper expression of this function's return type would use the two formal parameter names with decltype: decltype(lhs + rhs).
But, where a return type is traditionally specified, those two formal parameters are not yet in scope.
Consequently, this code will not compile:
// This will not compile
template<typename TL, typename TR>
decltype(lhs + rhs) Add(const TL& lhs, const TR& rhs) {
    return lhs + rhs;
}
The formal parameters are in scope, where a trailing return type is specified:
template<typename TL, typename TR>
auto Add(const TL& lhs, const TR& rhs) -> decltype(lhs + rhs) {
    return lhs + rhs;
}

See also
 Language enhancements of C++ 11

References

C++